The 2015 Donegal Senior Hurling Championship was the 85th staging of the Donegal Senior Hurling Championship since its establishment by the Donegal County Board in 1924. The championship began on 11 July 2015 and ended on 12 September 2015.

Burt were the defending champions and successfully retained the title following a 2-7 to 0-12 defeat of Seán McCumhaills in the final.

Results

Table

Final

References

Donegal Senior Hurling Championship
Donegal Senior Hurling Championship